Apteria is a genus of flowering plants in the Burmanniaceae, first described as a genus in 1834. It contains only one known species, Apteria aphylla, the nodding-nixie, native to the southern United States (E Texas to S Georgia and Florida), Mexico, Central America, the West Indies, and South America.

Description
The nodding-nixie is an  herb and a perennial flower which blooms during September to November. The flowers that bloom are either purple or white, either fully purple or white with purple marks. These flowers can grow to about 10 inches in height. The fruit of this plant is a capsule.

References

External links
Southeastern Flora

Burmanniaceae
Monotypic Dioscoreales genera
Flora of South America
Flora of North America